Ali Galyer (born 19 June 1998) is a New Zealand swimmer. Born in Australia before moving to USA when she was three, she had never lived in New Zealand. Her New Zealand citizenship comes from her father. She went to the University of Kentucky where she studied marketing. After she finished at Kentucky, she moved to New Zealand to live and train with the Coast Swim Club elite team.

She competed in the women's 200 metre backstroke at the 2019 World Aquatics Championships.

References

External links
 

1998 births
Living people
Kentucky Wildcats women's swimmers
New Zealand female swimmers
Place of birth missing (living people)
Female backstroke swimmers
Swimmers at the 2020 Summer Olympics
Olympic swimmers of New Zealand
21st-century New Zealand women